Boyevo is a rural locality (a selo) and the administrative center of Boyevskoye Rural Settlement, Kashirsky District, Voronezh Oblast, Russia. The population was 1,961 as of 2018. There are 18 streets.

Geography 
Boyevo is located 32 km west of Kashirskoye (the district's administrative centre) by road. Kolodezny is the nearest rural locality.

References 

Rural localities in Kashirsky District, Voronezh Oblast
Voronezhsky Uyezd